Springfield–Beckley Municipal Airport  is a civil-military airport five miles (8 km) south of Springfield, in Clark County, Ohio, United States. It is owned by the city of Springfield. It is named after the Beckley family, a member of which knew the Wright Brothers, and witnessed and photographed their first flights.

Three units of the Ohio Air National Guard, including the 178th Wing (formerly 178th Fighter Wing) are based at the co-located Springfield Air National Guard Base.

Springfield had scheduled airline flights, on TWA in 1948-50 and on Lake Central in 1953-55.

Facilities
 06/24: 9,009 x 150 ft (2,746 x 46 m), surface: asphalt/concrete
 15/33: 5,499 x 100 ft (1,676 x 30 m), surface: asphalt

In the year ending November 29, 2005 the airport had 62,000 aircraft operations, average 169 per day: 75% general aviation, 21% military and 4% air taxi. 81 aircraft are based at this airport: 59% single-engine, 14% multi-engine, 1% jet, 1% ultralight and 25% military.

References

External links 
Springfield–Beckley Municipal Airport
Springfield Air National Guard Base (official site)
Springfield Air National Guard Base (GlobalSecurity.org)

Airports in Ohio
Buildings and structures in Clark County, Ohio
Transportation in Clark County, Ohio